Playdays (known as Playbus until December 1989) is a British pre-school television programme which ran from 1988 to 1997 on Children's BBC. The show was the successor to Play School and, like its predecessor, was designed as an educational programme.

The show's name was changed after the BBC received a complaint from the National Playbus Association.

In 2002, reruns were moved to the new CBeebies channel until August 2004.

The stops

The show would begin with an animated title sequence of the Playbus driving along until it reached the bus stop. The bus stopped at a different place each day.

Monday – The Why Bird Stop
Why Bird lived at the Lost Property Office, where things that were left on the Playbus were filed until someone claimed them. She interacted with the human bus driver – there were several throughout the series. She had a special computer called the Why-Tech, which had a variety of uses: it could provide music for songs, pictures for stories, instructions for making something in keeping with the programme's theme, or to help sing a song (e.g. paper sugar buns for Five Currant Buns).  In later series, the office became more like a warehouse, called "Why's Supplies".
 
There were at least 5 different Why-Techs used over the years. The first one had a brown wood effect and was used until early 1991. The second one was remote controlled and used throughout that year. The third one was blue and continued to be used in the opening credits until the end.
 
It also showed videos, usually to show how everyday things were made – socks, toothbrushes etc. Sometimes, either Peggy, or Poppy, or both visited the Lost Property Office. In a later series, the office installed a telephone, where people, usually Peggy or Poppy, could phone in asking for particular things, (examples include information about spiders and a night time picture to help someone sleep during the day). Why Bird was voiced and puppeteered by Ellie Darvill for 9 series.

Tuesday – The Playground Stop
A variety of different things were involved. The programme always opened with the presenter (several, including Dave Benson Philips and Elizabeth Fost), saying, "Girls and boys, come out to play...", followed by the programme's theme, (e.g. we're playing racing games today). The show featured a group of children doing activities, such as pretending to be cooks and making paper meals.
 
Dave was accompanied by a glove puppet named Chester. Elizabeth was also accompanied by a glove puppet called Ruby. The programme always featured a rhyme accompanied by Makaton sign language and a song performed by a marionette named Lizzie Dreams, who loved to sing and dance. She was occasionally accompanied by another marionette named Nick. There was also a story, often featuring Max and his magical chest of dressing-up clothes.

Wednesday – The Dot Stop (1988–1992) / The Roundabout Stop (1992–1997)
The non-speaking Dot, played by Rebecca Higgins, had fun with music or numbers and counting. Later there were three Dots: 'The Dot who plays the violin' (Eithne Hannigan), 'The Dot who plays the drums' (Liz Kitchen) and 'The Dot you can count on' (Dyanne White). Sometimes, a puppet called Dash would appear and squirm its way through holes in the set. It had a song: "Not number one, not number two, not number three or four, not number five, not number six, only one Dash can do tricks!" Another pair of puppet friends were Professor Mopp and his blue dog Morgan. The Violinist and Counting Dots had a sidekick called Mr Domino (Peter Gunn, Stephen Cannon). The Dot who plays the drums was accompanied by Domino the Musical Monkey.
 
It was later replaced by the Roundabout Stop, presented by Mr. Jolly (Robin Fritz), who maintained a fairground carousel called Rosie, whose platform initially did not have any objects to ride on. The show featured Bitsy Bob (Michele Durler), who played music and made things, and initially Bella and Baxter the Numbears followed by puppets Morris Cog and Milly Sprocket (Nick Mercer and Michele Durler), who presented a segment called "Morris and Milly's Numerical Melodies", where they sang a song glorifying a particular number. The Roundabout Stop also played host to an array of extra visitors to help with Rosie's puzzles, including but not limited to, Rhythm Man (David Rubin), Dilys Litefoot (Teresa Gallagher), Paul Morocco, Allesandro Bernardi, Morton McKewan (Iain Lauchlan) and Leaping Lindy (Caroline Hinds). Also joining Mr. Jolly occasionally were Professor Mopp and Morgan from the Dot Stop. During the time Clive Duncan played Mr. Jolly, the team was later joined by the musician, Charlie Grindle (Nick Mercer), who also appeared as one of the bus drivers from The Why Bird Stop. Charlie often sang songs for them as well. The main body of the episode featured the characters finding different shaped pictures, which came together to form the title of a nursery rhyme or song, which was performed by the entire cast at the end of the episode. In later episodes (1995 to 1997) Mr Jolly was played by Andy Hockley. Rosie's platform bore a tractor, a ship, an aeroplane and a car. These episodes featured Peggy, Poppy and Why Bird, who rode on the roundabout and went off on adventures (but on some episodes only Peggy and Why went on adventures so on the 3rd shape they would both go together). Due to Peggy's small size in comparison to Why Bird and Poppy, she would typically ride the ship or the tractor on the roundabout so that she could sit astride the vehicle's funnel as it meant she could be seen better.
 
At the start and end of each adventure, Mr Jolly would sing the song 'Roll up and ride on Rosie'.  A picture associated with the adventure appeared in their shaped ticket (purple circle, red square, pink triangle, yellow diamond, green arch or blue rectangle), and these would combine to make the song, which ended the episode.

A special 40-minute direct-to-video feature called 'Winter Adventure' was released in 1997. The special saw Mr Jolly, again played by Andy Hockley with Poppy, Why Bird and Peggy visiting a cottage for the weekend.

Thursday – The Patch Stop
Featuring Sam Patch, a small scarecrow doll and later replaced by Peggy Patch, a small rag doll who were both very kind natured. Sam and later Peggy would often travel places. From 1994 onwards Peggy would leave clues for children to find her and she would also be joined by Parsnip (a brown rabbit) who first appeared about 1991–92, Poppy and/or Why Bird later in the episode. She was originally non-speaking, but gained a voice (Sally Preisig) in 1994. Presenters included Ian Henderson, Vanessa Amberleigh, Sarah Davison, Teresa Gallagher, Neil Bett and Peter Quilter.

Friday – The Tent Stop (1988–1995) / The Poppy Stop (1995–1997)
A group of actors, including Trish Cooke, Ricky Diamond, Robert Hopkins, Will Brenton, Sue Monroe & Sarah Davison, would dress up, and with the help of some children, perform a play or show. Humphry, a unicyclist puppet, and Wobble, a roly-poly clown also took part in the stories and they sometimes accompanied Lizzie for her songs (see The Playground Stop above).
 
When the stop became the Poppy Stop, the setting was at Poppy the cat's house, typically presented by Karl Woolley. Why Bird, Peggy Patch and other characters would often also appear in episodes at Poppy's house.
 
At Christmas time, the Playbus would stop at The Christmas Tree Stop. These special episodes featured characters from all the usual stops.

Live shows 
Playdays went on various tours around the UK during its run. The shows often saw all of the puppet characters coming together. Unlike the show, Peggy Patch was played by a person. Many of the characters were also portrayed by different actors when compared to the television series.

VHS releases

Magazines, books, audio tapes and PC games were also produced during its run.

References

External links
Playdays at Classic Kids TV

BBC children's television shows
British children's television series
British television shows featuring puppetry
British preschool education television series
1980s British children's television series
1990s British children's television series
1988 British television series debuts
1997 British television series endings
1980s preschool education television series
1990s preschool education television series
English-language television shows
Sign language television shows
CBeebies
Television series by BBC Studios